Academy of Berlin, Berlin Academy, or other variants may refer to:

 Prussian Academy of Arts, founded in 1696 in Berlin, Brandenburg, split in 1955 into East and West Berlin schools
 Academy of Arts, Berlin, re-formed in 1993 by merging the two academies of East and West Berlin
 Prussian Academy of Sciences, established in Berlin in 1700, fell apart under Nazi rule in 1945
 German Academy of Sciences at Berlin, reorganised in East Germany in 1946, disbanded in 1991
 Berlin-Brandenburg Academy of Sciences and Humanities, reconstituted by interstate treaty in 1992
 American Academy in Berlin, a research and cultural institution founded in 1994

See also
 Berlin Singing Academy (disambiguation)